Mahendranagar may refer to several places in Nepal:

Mahendranagar, Mahakali - 2nd largest city in Sudurpaschim Pradesh of Nepal, today Bhimdatta
Mahendranagar, Janakpur
Mahendranagar, Kosi